Protecovasaurus is a genus of archosaurian reptile from the Late Triassic of the southwestern United States. It was initially described as a basal ornithischian dinosaur, but was redescribed as a non-dinosaurian  archosaur by Irmis et al.  (2006). The type species, Protecovasaurus lucasi, was formally described by Andrew B. Heckert in 2004.

Its name, Protecovasaurus, means "before Tecovasaurus". Tecovas was the formation the holotype specimen was found in.

References

 Heckert, A. B. (2004). Late Triassic microvertebrates from the lower Chinle Group (Otischalkian-Adamanian: Carnian), southwestern U.S.A. New Mexico Museum of Natural History and Science, Bulletin 27, 170 p.
 Irmis, R.B., Parker, W.G., Nesbitt, S.J., and Liu, J. (2006). Early ornithischian dinosaurs: the Triassic record. Historical Biology, 19(1):3-22.

External links
Dinosaur Mailing List entry which discusses the genus

Triassic diapsids
Prehistoric archosaurs
Late Triassic reptiles of North America
Prehistoric reptile genera